Arlem Breweries Ground is a cricket ground in Margao, Goa, India.  Established in 1976, the ground held its first first-class to be played there came in the 1985/86 Ranji Trophy when Goa played Hyderabad.  Between the 1985/86 season and the 2003/04 season, the ground held twelve first-class matches.  The first List A match played there came when Goa played Andhra Pradesh in the 1994/95 Ranji Trophy one-day competition.  Seven further List A matches have been played on the ground, the last of which saw Goa play Karnataka in the 2004/05 Ranji Trophy one-day competition.

References

External links
Arlem Breweries Ground at ESPNcricinfo
Arlem Breweries Ground at CricketArchive

Cricket grounds in Goa
Sports venues completed in 1976
1976 establishments in Goa, Daman and Diu
Buildings and structures in Margao
20th-century architecture in India